The Women in His Life is a 1933 American pre-Code crime film directed by George B. Seitz and starring Otto Kruger.

Cast
 Otto Kruger as Kent 'Barry' Barringer
 Una Merkel as Miss 'Simmy' Simmons
 Ben Lyon as Roger McKane
 Isabel Jewell as Catherine 'Cathy' Watson
 Roscoe Karns as Lester
 Irene Hervey as Doris Worthing
 C. Henry Gordon as Tony Perez
 Samuel S. Hinds as Thomas J. Worthing
 Irene Franklin as Mrs. Florence Steele / Madame Celeste
 Muriel Evans as Molly
 Raymond Hatton as Curly, Tony's bodyguard
 Jean Howard as Information girl
 Paul Hurst as Paul, Tony's bodyguard

References

External links

1933 films
1933 crime films
American black-and-white films
American crime films
Films directed by George B. Seitz
Films with screenplays by F. Hugh Herbert
Metro-Goldwyn-Mayer films
1930s American films
1930s English-language films